Christian Campbell (born 1979) is a Trinidadian-Bahamian poet, essayist and cultural critic who has lived in the Caribbean, the United States, the United Kingdom and Canada. Trained as an academic, he was an assistant professor in the Department of English at the University of Toronto.

Education and career
Christian Campbell was born in The Bahamas of Bahamian and Trinidadian heritage. He went to Queen's College Secondary School, graduating at the age of 15, and attended Macalester College on scholarship, graduating at the age of 19. He went on to earn an M.Phil. in Modern British Literature from Balliol College, Oxford University, where he studied as a Rhodes Scholar, and then an M.A. and a Ph.D. from Duke University.

He is currently Assistant Professor of English at the English department of University of Toronto, where in 2010 he invited Nobel Prize Laureate Derek Walcott. Campbell's teaching and research interests comprise Caribbean Literature; Black Diaspora Literatures and Cultures; Cultural Studies/Popular Culture; Poetry/Poetics; Postcolonial Theory; Creative Writing.

Campbell represented The Bahamas at the Cultural Olympiad's Poetry Parnassus in 2012 at the Southbank Centre in London.

Writing
In 2010, Campbell won the best first collection prize at the Aldeburgh Festival in Suffolk for his Running the Dusk (Peepal Tree Press, 2010). Furthermore, the work was shortlisted for the Forward Prize for Best First Collection, the Cave Canem Prize and the Guyana Prize for Literature. Publications in which his work has been published, featured or reviewed include The New York Times, The Guardian, Small Axe, Callaloo, The Financial Times, The Routledge Companion to Anglophone Caribbean Literature, and New Caribbean Poetry: An Anthology (2007, edited by Kei Miller).

Personal life
Of Bahamian and Trinidadian heritage, Campbell has lived in the Caribbean, the US, the UK and in Canada. He describes himself as "a nomad that comes from nomads".

Works
Running the Dusk (2010), Peepal Tree Press. Translated into Spanish as Correr el Crepúsculo (Cuba: Ediciones Santiago).

References

External links
 University Toronto Faculty & Staff
 Poetry Archive
 Poets of the Caribbean
 "Christian Campbell takes Aldeburgh first collection prize for poetry", 5 November 2010
 "University of Toronto: Interview with Professor Christian Campbell" (YouTube video), 22 June 2012

1979 births
Living people
English literature academics
Male poets
Place of birth missing (living people)
Alumni of the University of Oxford
Duke University alumni
Bahamian poets
21st-century poets
Macalester College alumni
21st-century Canadian male writers
Academic staff of the University of Toronto